Leonius was the Dean of Wells during 1213.

References

Deans of Wells